Historically, Puerto Rico, which is now an unincorporated territory of the U.S., has been dominated by a settler society of religiously and ethnically diverse Europeans, primarily of Spanish descent, and Sub-Saharan Africans. The majority of Puerto Ricans are multiracial, including people of European, African, Asian, Native American, and of mixed-race descent.

History

Before the first major influx of West Africans into Puerto Rico in the 16th century, Spanish colonizers forced the Taíno natives "into slavery, exploiting their labor in the gold mines and on plantations." After nearly a century of exploitation, enslavement, murder, and decline of the Taíno people, Spanish colonizers looked to a new source of slave labor. In 1598 they signed their first contract to bring a large number of West Africans to Puerto Rico. Gold mines, ginger plantations and sugar plantations heavily relied on the slave work from the Taíno and West Africans. Since the majority of the European and African colonizers and enslaved laborers arrived without women, intermarriage often occurred with the remaining Taíno women. The offspring from these interracial relationships created a population of Mulattos and Mestizos.

When the gold mines were declared depleted in 1570 and mining came to an end in Puerto Rico, the vast majority of the white Spanish settlers left the island to seek their fortunes in the richer colonies, such as Mexico, and the island became a Spanish garrison. The majority of those who stayed behind were either black or mulatto. The next major wave of West African slaves into Puerto Rico came after The Royal Decree of Graces of 1789, which allowed Spanish subjects in the Caribbean to participate in the business of slave trade and labor, particular importing slaves from the Gold Coast. 

By the time Spain reestablished her commercial ties with Puerto Rico, the island had a large multiracial population. Those demographics, though, changed during the 19th century when the Spanish Crown issued the Royal Decree of Graces of 1815 which also resulted in "whitening" Puerto Rico's population from its offering of land, agricultural, and labor incentives to non-Hispanic white Europeans. The new arrivals continued to intermarry with the native islanders. "The Royal census of Puerto Rico in 1834 established that the island's population as 42,000 enslaved Africans, 25,000 colored freemen, 189,000 people who identified themselves as whites and 101,000 who were described as being of mixed ethnicity." A number of slave uprisings in plantations took place between 1820 and 1868. Puerto Rico abolished slavery in 1873.

Discrimination
The term "white Puerto Rican", as well as that of "colored Puerto Rican", was coined by the United States Department of Defense in the first decade of the 20th century in order to handle their own North American problem with nonwhite people whom they were drafting and had its basis on the American one-drop rule.  The one-drop rule stated that if you had just one drop of Black blood in you, you were Black, not white; that is, if you are not 100% white, then no matter what shade of lightness you are, you are Black.  The white upper class made deals with U.S. industrialists and supported U.S. policies in Puerto Rico at the expense of Afro-Puerto Rican civil rights.  Puerto Rico passed the Civil Rights Act of Puerto Rico in 1943. Revolutionary leaders, including Pedro Albizu Campos in the 1950s, fought to eliminate the racial discrimination heightened by U.S. imperialism and to place Afro–Puerto Ricans in political positions of power.

Recent events
In 2019, José Pichy Torres Zamora, a Puerto Rican politician was taken to task for making a racist comment regarding the black people of Loíza.

In June 2020, amid the worldwide protests against racism after the murder of George Floyd, people of the Municipality of Loíza joined in and Juan Dalmau Ramírez, a high-ranking member of the Puerto Rican Independence Party, put forth the need to educate Puerto Rico's children on human rights, and ending racism and xenophobia. The University of Puerto Rico held an online forum on racism and discrimination. During this time as well, a Black family in Canóvanas, filed a cease-and-desist complaint against an 82-year old woman neighbor for alleged Black racial slurs, playing loud music 24x7 directed at their new home, and harassing them with the posting of homemade drawings that included degrading comments about Black people. The woman received a citation from the police for playing loud music and was summoned to Court to answer to the other complaints. People also protested in front of the governor's mansion in San Juan.

In 2022, a flyer asking "do you want this BLACK man to be mayor of Guayama" circulated before elections.

Legacy

Contemporary demographics

The current Puerto Rican population reflects the former immigration policy of 1815 spearheaded by the Spanish government in the 19th century, with hundreds of immigrants arriving from Corsica, France, Ireland, Scotland, Germany, Italy, and Portugal, as well as Arabs from Lebanon. 

Until 1950 the U.S. Bureau of the Census attempted to quantify the racial composition of the island's population, while experimenting with various racial taxonomies. In 1960 the Census dropped the racial identification question for Puerto Rico but included it again in the year 2000 census. The only category that remained constant over time was white, even as other racial labels shifted greatly—from "colored" to "Black," "mulatto," and "other". Regardless of the precise terminology, the Census reported that the bulk of the Puerto Rican population was white from 1899 to 2000. In the 2000 U.S. Census Puerto Ricans were asked to choose which racial category they self-identified with. The breakdown was follows: white (mostly Spanish origin) 80.5%, black 8%, Amerindian 0.4%, Asian 0.2%, mixed and other 10.9%.

References

Human rights in Puerto Rico
Puerto Rico
Puerto Rico